Pamani Express is an Express train belonging to Indian Railways connecting Tirupati in Andhra Pradesh with Mannargudi in Tamil Nadu.

This is the only express train that Terminates and Originates from the Cauvery Delta Region and passes through Villupuram and does not go to Chennai. Similarly several other similar trains also originates and terminates in cauvery delta region which won't go to chennai but all of them passes through Tiruchirappalli.

Coach composite

The train has standard ICF rakes with max speed of 110 kmph. The train consists of 16 coaches:

 7 Second Sitting (Denoted by 'D)
 1 AC Chair Car (Denoted By C1)
 2 Second-class Luggage/parcel van
 5 General 
 2 general + Disabled + Break

Schedule
PAMANI EXPRESS - Schedule and timing as below

Route
This Train Has Following Stops 

 Pakala Junction 
 Chittoor 
 Katpadi Junction 
 Vellore Cantt 
 Tiruvannamalai 
 Villupuram Junction 
 Cuddalore Port Junction 
 Chidambaram 
 Sirkazhi 
 Vaithisvaran Koil 
 Mayiladuthurai Junction 
 Peralam Junction 
 Thiruvarur Junction 
 Nidamangalam Junction

External links

http://indiarailinfo.com/train/-train-pamani-express-17407/18469/837/9633

Transport in Tirupati
Transport in Mannargudi
Railway services introduced in 2012
Named passenger trains of India
Rail transport in Andhra Pradesh
Rail transport in Tamil Nadu
Express trains in India